Anatoliy Lebid (8 September 1944) is a former professional Soviet football forward and coach.

Lebid played seven games in the Soviet Top League for FC Zorya Luhansk in 1967.

His son, Vladimir Lebed, played for the Russia national football team.

References

External links
 
 Profile of Lebid at the Our Futbol Luhansk

1944 births
Living people
Sportspeople from Kherson
Soviet footballers
FC Krystal Kherson players
FC Bukovyna Chernivtsi players
FC Metalist Kharkiv players
FC Zorya Luhansk players
FC Zirka Kropyvnytskyi players
FC Tytan Armyansk players
Soviet Top League players
Soviet football managers
Ukrainian football managers
FC Krystal Kherson managers
Association football forwards